Coathill Hospital is a health facility in Hospital Road, Coatbridge, North Lanarkshire, Scotland. It is managed by NHS Lanarkshire.

History
The facility has its origins in the Old Monkland Poorhouse which was designed by Robert Baird and opened in 1861. A fever hospital was built on the south part of the site in the late 19th century. It became the Old Monkland Home Poor Law Institution in 1930. There were a total of over 50 cases and suspected cases of typhoid fever in the hospital following the outbreak in Coatbridge in summer 1946. The facility joined the National Health Service as Coathill Hospital in 1948.

References

1861 establishments in Scotland
Hospitals established in 1861
Hospital buildings completed in 1861
NHS Scotland hospitals
Hospitals in North Lanarkshire
NHS Lanarkshire